Édouard Muller may refer to:

 Édouard Muller (painter) (1823–1876), French painter
 Édouard Muller (Nestlé) (1885–1948), Swiss-French businessman
 Édouard Muller (cyclist) (1919–1997), French cyclist

See also
 Eduard Müller (disambiguation), for the equivalent German spelling